Mario Todman (born 29 November 1974 in Road Town, Tortola) is a former sprinter from the British Virgin Islands.

Todman represented British Virgin Islands at the Summer Olympics in the 1996 Summer Olympics in Atlanta, competing in the 4x100 and the 4x400 metres relay; the team finished 7th and 6th in their respective heats, not qualifying for either next round.

His older brother Willis also competed at the 1996 Summer Olympics in the relays.

References

1974 births
Living people
British Virgin Islands male sprinters
Athletes (track and field) at the 1994 Commonwealth Games
Commonwealth Games competitors for the British Virgin Islands
Athletes (track and field) at the 1996 Summer Olympics
Olympic athletes of the British Virgin Islands